is a private women's junior college in Kitakyushu, Fukuoka, Japan, established in 1960.

External links
 Official website

Japanese junior colleges
Educational institutions established in 1960
Private universities and colleges in Japan
Universities and colleges in Fukuoka Prefecture
1960 establishments in Japan